Dance Revolution (originally titled Dance, Dance, Dance! during planning stages) is a television series from CBS and DIC Entertainment Corporation, in association with Konami Digital Entertainment, Inc., produced by Brookwell McNamara Entertainment and CBS Television) (Sean McNamara and David Brookwell), and based on the video game series Dance Dance Revolution.

The series premiered on September 16, 2006, as part of KOL Secret Slumber Party on CBS. The entire series had a focus on promoting fitness and nutrition to children. The series, however, was not renewed after its first season. Its last broadcast was on September 8, 2007.

Dance Revolution was taped at Raleigh Studios in Hollywood, California.

Synopsis
Dance Revolution was hosted by DJ Rick (a.k.a. Rick Adams) and the Slumber Party Girls (Caroline Scott, Cassie Scerbo, Karla Deras, Carolina Carattini and Mallory Low).

Every half-hour episode started with music from the house band, the Slumber Party Girls. Then DJ Rick would introduce the "Dance Crews" (the teams of contestants) and the judges. The Dance Crews would then start to perform their own dance routines. When they were finished, choreographer Leah Lynette would come to teach the Dance Crews some new styles of dancing. Finally, the Dance Crews would have a dance off. The judges would then declare who the winning Dance Crew was and the winners would move on to the next round, leading up to the finale, which awarded. $25,000 scholarship to the winner. Although Dance Revolution was inspired by the video game series Dance Dance Revolution, there is nothing similar between the two except for the name.

References

External links
 

2006 American television series debuts
2007 American television series endings
2000s American variety television series
2000s American children's game shows
American children's education television series
English-language television shows
Television series about teenagers
Television series by Brookwell McNamara Entertainment
Television series by DIC Entertainment
Television series by DHX Media
CBS original programming
American television shows based on video games
Works based on Konami video games
Dance television shows
Live action television shows based on video games